The Roman Catholic Diocese of Kongolo is a Latin suffragan diocese in the Ecclesiastical province of Lubumbashi in the Democratic Republic of the Congo.

Its cathedral episcopal see is Cathédrale Sacré-Coeur-de-Marie (dedicated to Our Lady's Heart) in the city of Kongolo.

History 
 Established on June 30, 1911 as Apostolic Prefecture of Northern Katanga, on territory split off from the then Apostolic Vicariate of Léopoldville
 Promoted on June 18, 1935 as Apostolic Vicariate of Northern Katanga, hence entitled to a titular bishop
 Renamed March 8, 1951 as Apostolic Vicariate of Kongolo, after its see 
 Lost territory on 23 April 1956 to establish the then Apostolic Vicariate of Kindu
 Promoted on November 10, 1959 as Diocese of Kongolo, no longer missionary nor exempt
 Lost territory on 10 March 1966 to the Diocese of Kabinda
 Gained territory on 8 May 1971 from the Diocese of Baudouinville (now Kalemie–Kirungu)
 Lost territory on 31 May 1971 to establish the Diocese of Manono

Bishops 
(all Roman rite)

Ordinaries 
(So far all but one are members of the Holy Ghost Fathers (C.S.Sp.).)
 Apostolic Prefects of Northern Katanga
 Fr. Emilio Callewaert, C.S.Sp. (1912 – 1922)
 Fr. Luigi Lempereur, C.S.Sp. (1922 – 1930)
 Fr. Giorgio Giuseppe Haezaert, C.S.Sp. (1931.02.19 – 1935.06.18 see below)

 Apostolic Vicars of Northern Katanga 
 Bishop Giorgio Giuseppe Haezaert, C.S.Sp. (see above 1935.06.18 – 1949), Titular Bishop of Pertusa (1935.06.18 – 1957.09.29)
 Bishop Gustave Joseph Bouve, C.S.Sp. (1950.05.31 – 1951.03.08 see below), Titular Bishop of Cremna (1950.05.31 – 1959.11.10)
 Apostolic Vicars of Kongolo  
 Bishop Gustave Joseph Bouve, C.S.Sp. (see above 1951.03.08 – 1959.11.10 see below)

 Bishops of Kongolo
 Bishop Gustave Joseph Bouve, C.S.Sp. (see above 1959.11.10 – 1970.09.01), afterward Titular Bishop of Zama minor (1970.09.01 – 1971.03.04)
 Bishop Jérôme Nday Kanyangu Lukundwe (1971.01.16 – 2007.03.31)
 Bishop Oscar Ngoy wa Mpanga, (C.S.Sp.) (2007.03.31 - ...), also Apostolic Administrator of Kalemie–Kirungu (Congo-Kinshasa) (2010.09.15 – 2015.03.31)

Other priests of this diocese who became bishops 
Vincent de Paul Kwanga Njubu, appointed Bishop of Manono in 2005
Fulgence Muteba Mugalu, appointed Bishop of Kilwa-Kasenga in 2005

See also 
 Roman Catholicism in the Democratic Republic of the Congo

Sources and external links
 GCatholic.org, with incumbent biography links
 Catholic Hierarchy

Roman Catholic dioceses in the Democratic Republic of the Congo
Christian organizations established in 1911
Roman Catholic dioceses and prelatures established in the 20th century
Roman Catholic Ecclesiastical Province of Lubumbashi